Manjima Mohan is an Indian actress who primarily appears in Tamil and Malayalam films. She started her career as a child artist in Malayalam films. she made her debut as a lead actress with  Oru Vadakkan Selfie (2015) in Malayalam  and Achcham Enbadhu Madamaiyada (2016) in Tamil. She won the Filmfare Award for Best Female Debut – South in 2017.

Personal life

Manjima is the daughter of veteran cinematographer Vipin Mohan and dancer Kalamandalam Girija. After completing her schooling at Nirmala Bhavan Higher Secondary School, Thiruvananthapuram, Kerala, she pursued a B.Sc. degree in mathematics from Stella Maris College, Chennai, Tamil Nadu. She married Gautham Karthik on 28 November 2022.

Career
Manjima was a leading child artist in Malayalam film industry in early 2000s later she also hosted a television call-in show for kids by the name ‘'Hai Kids'’ on Surya TV for three years which rose her fame among Malayali audience.

Despite having had acting experience, she said that she was "not at all confident" when she started shooting for the film and that the initial days were "terrifying". Oru Vadakkan Selfie, which was directed by G. Prajith and scripted by Vineeth Sreenivasan, featured Manjima Mohan as the female lead.

Upon the release of Oru Vadakkan Selfie, Manjima landed her first Tamil film, Achcham Enbadhu Madamaiyada. Its director Gautham Vasudev Menon, who was impressed with her work in Oru Vadakkan Selfie, cast Manjima as the female lead, after she had gone through an audition.

In 2017 she had two Tamil films, one opposite Udhayanidhi Stalin - Ippadai Vellum and the other, Sathriyan, opposite Vikram Prabhu. In 2019, she made her come back to Malayalam with Mikhael opposite Nivin Pauly for the second time . She also has a few Tamil films in her career, including Tughlaq Durbar with Vijay Sethupathi, and Raashii Khanna.

Filmography

Awards and nominations

References

External links
 

Living people
Indian film actresses
Actresses from Thiruvananthapuram
Actresses in Malayalam cinema
Actresses in Tamil cinema
21st-century Indian actresses
Actresses in Telugu cinema
Stella Maris College, Chennai alumni
20th-century Indian actresses
1993 births
Child actresses in Malayalam cinema